The Journal of Legal Pluralism and Unofficial Law (formerly African Law Studies) is a triannual peer-reviewed academic journal focusing on all aspects of legal pluralism and unofficial law. It was established in 1969 and is the official publication of the Commission on Legal Pluralism. The journal is published by Taylor & Francis. The editor-in-chief is Dik Roth (Wageningen University). Past editors-in-chief include Melanie Wiber (University of New Brunswick) and Gordon Woodman (University of Birmingham).

External links 
 

Comparative law journals
Customary legal systems
English-language journals
Publications established in 1969
Taylor & Francis academic journals
Triannual journals